Billy Harper Quintet in Europe is an album by American jazz saxophonist Billy Harper recorded in 1979 for the Italian Soul Note label. The album was the first release for the record label.

Reception 

In a review for AllMusic, Jeff Schwachter wrote: "In Europe gives a fine glimpse at the power and intensity of Harper's compositions and his tremendous abilities as an improviser... Highly recommended music for post-bop and free jazz appreciators."

The authors of The Penguin Guide to Jazz Recordings called the album "faintly disappointing," but noted that it is "full of potential and marked by pretty much the same strengths as Harper's other work." They described "Calvary" as "superb."

Track listing 
All compositions by Billy Harper
 "Priestess" - 13:10   
 "Calvary" - 7:32   
 "Illumination" - 21:59  
Recorded at Barigozzi Studio in Milano, Italy on January 24 & 25, 1979

Personnel 
Billy Harper - tenor saxophone
Everett Hollins - trumpet
Fred Hersch - piano
Louie "Mbiki" Spears - bass
Horace Arnold - drums

References 

Black Saint/Soul Note albums
Billy Harper albums
1979 albums